White Teeth is a 2002 British four-part drama TV serial based on the 2000 novel of the same name written by Zadie Smith.

The series was directed by Julian Jarrold, adapted by Simon Burke, and stars Om Puri and Phil Davis. It was broadcast by Channel 4 over four consecutive weeks between 17 September 2002 and 8 October 2002.

Overview
White Teeth consists of four self-contained short-stories, focusing on a major male character as he encounters a turning point in his life, with background cameos from other characters. The series spans 20 years of three cultures, chronicling the interlinked stories of three families over three generations in a multicultural area of north-west London from 1974 to 1992.

The four-hour saga also features leaps back to the Second World War, where Samad and Archie served together, and even further back to the 1857 Indian Mutiny.

Cast

Main cast
Om Puri as Samad Miah Iqbal
Phil Davis as Archie Jones
Naomie Harris as Clara Bowden/Jones
Archie Panjabi as Alsana Begum/Iqbal
Geraldine James as Joyce Malfen
Robert Bathurst as Marcus Malfen
Christopher Simpson as Magid Iqbal/Millat Iqbal
Sarah Ozeke as Irie Jones
James McAvoy as Josh Malfen

Recurring cast
Mona Hammond as Hortense Bowden
Kammy Darweish as Ardashir
Charlie Creed-Miles as Ryan Topps
Maggie O'Neill as Poppy Burt-Jones
Deepak Verma as Shiva
Jeff Mirza as Mohammed Ishmael
Nina Wadia as Neena
Sophie Winkleman as Joely
Rufus Jones as Crispin
Chu Omambala as Brother Ibrahim
Jacob Scipio as Young Magid Iqbal/Millat Iqbal

Guest cast
John Simm as Mr Hero
Russell Brand as Merlin
Vernon Dobtcheff as Devil of Dachau

Episodes

Production
White Teeth was originally due to become a BBC drama series. However, after Channel 4 acquired the rights, it compressed a £3.5 million version of Smith's novel into four one-hour episodes. Company Pictures originally approached Zadie Smith to adapt the screenplay for the series from her novel. However, she declined the offer in order to continue with her next novel The Autograph Man. Smith was later given the role of creative consultant.

In February 2002, the adaptation went into production. It was shot mainly in Willesden and Cricklewood as well as the Caribbean and the Indian sub-continent.

Soundtrack

Track listing

Release
In the United Kingdom, White Teeth was broadcast on Channel 4 over four consecutive weeks from 17 September 2002 to 8 October 2002. In the United States, the series aired as part of the PBS Masterpiece Theatre anthology over two consecutive weeks on 11 May 2003 and 18 May 2003. The series was also broadcast in; Australia in November 2002, Sweden in March 2003, Finland in September 2003 as Valkoiset hampaat, and Denmark in December 2004 as Hvide tænder.

The DVD of the series was released on 9 May 2011.

Reception
White Teeth's first episode received 2.2 million viewers and a 14 percent audience share between 10pm and 11.05pm, according to unofficial overnight figures. The series gained healthy viewing figures throughout and peaked at 3.5 million during the final episode.

In October 2002, the series was hailed as one of the must-watch shows that autumn on British television.

William Feaver called the series "an enjoyable epic sweep type romp... liked the way in which topics are brought in, adroitly dealt with and dealt out." Bonnie Greer thought "the adapter did a very good job... broke it open and made it into something else... lovely multicultural sweep... The cast was wonderful." Mark Lawson "thought the director... was trying to put a visual style to replace the prose style." Tim Lott said "it captured the energy of the book very well... more successful than the book, artistically... very well cast... It's very brilliantly cut. It has great pace... It's one of the best adaptations."

BBC News reported "White Teeth lives up to the book but arguably betters it. The screenplay captures the book's grand scale and intimacy. But it also keeps up the pace where the novel began to flag... it is fresh, energetic and effortlessly played out by a great cast."

TV Quick thought the series was "a fabulous four part drama, with a cracking soundtrack." John Leonard New York called it "superb... rambunctious...White Teeth is a wild ride..." Sean O'Hagen of The Observer described it as "taut and fast-moving... On the television screen, White Teeth unfolds as a thing of often surreal and impressionistic beauty..." Also adding that "it features a strong cast... as well as strong performances from relative newcomers..."

Daily Express thought the series was "beautifully shot, beautifully acted, this modern classic is a screen triumph." The Observer thought "the cinematography has a understated beauty rarely seen in television adaptations."

Book Magazine reported "wonderful... Indian superstar Om Puri is masterful." Express on Sunday reported "White Teeth may finally make Phil Davies the superstar he deserves to be." Independent on Sunday reported "a beguiling performance from newcomer Naomie Harris."

Awards and nominations

References

External links

Company Pictures website

2002 British television series debuts
2002 British television series endings
2000s British drama television series
2000s British television miniseries
British comedy television shows
British comedy-drama television shows
English-language television shows
Channel 4 miniseries
Television series by WGBH
Television series by All3Media
Television shows based on British novels
Television series set in the 1850s
Television series set in the 1940s
Television series set in the 1970s
Television series set in the 1980s
Television series set in the 1990s
Television shows set in London
Television shows set in India
Television shows set in Jamaica
Indian independence movement fiction
Films directed by Julian Jarrold